Rhagio annulatus  is a Palearctic species of snipe fly in the family Rhagionidae.

References

External links
Images representing Rhagio annulatus 

Rhagionidae
Insects described in 1776
Taxa named by Charles De Geer